San Antonio is a settlement in Saipan, in the Northern Mariana Islands. It is close to the southwestern tip of the island. Once a separate village, it is now virtually contiguous with other nearby villages on Beach Road (Highway 33), including Susupe, Chalan Kanoa and Chalan Piao.

Education
Commonwealth of the Northern Mariana Islands Public School System operates local public schools. San Antonio Elementary School was located in San Antonio.

References

External links

Towns and villages in the Northern Mariana Islands
Saipan